Events from the year 1883 in the arts

Events
 20 April – Claude Monet moves to the house in Giverny which will be his main residence for the rest of his life.
 28 October – Les XX established in Brussels by Octave Maus.
 J.-K. Huysmans publishes L'Art moderne.

Works

 Michael Ancher – Redningsbåden køres gennem klitterne ("The Lifeboat is Taken through the Dunes")
 Marie Bashkirtseff
 Autumn
 The Umbrella
 Arnold Böcklin – Isle of the Dead (Die Toteninsel, 3rd version)
 Gustave Caillebotte – Portrait of Henri Cordier
 William Merritt Chase
 Mrs Meigs at the Piano Organ
 Portrait of Miss Dora Wheeler
 John Collier – Marion Collier
 Pierre Auguste Cot – The Storm
 Pascal Dagnan-Bouveret – Hamlet and the Gravediggers
 Pierre Puvis de Chavannes
 The Dream
 Ludus Pro Patria
 Luke Fildes – The Village Wedding
 William Powell Frith – A Private View at the Royal Academy, 1881
 Jean-Léon Gérôme – The Christian Martyrs' Last Prayer
 James Guthrie
 A Hind's Daughter
 To Pastures New
 Sydney Prior Hall – The three daughters of King Edward VII and Queen Alexandra
 Ivan Kramskoi – Portrait of an Unknown Woman
 John Lavery – The Bridge at Grez
 Benjamin Williams Leader – The Valley of the Llugwy
 Charles-Auguste Lebourg – Labour (sculpture)
 Konstantin Makovsky – A Boyar Wedding Feast
 Jacek Malczewski – The Prisoners
 Claude Monet – Stormy Sea in Étretat
 William Morris – Strawberry Thief textile design
 Walter Osborne – Apple Gathering, Quimperlé
 Paul Philippoteaux – Gettysburg Cyclorama
 Pierre-Auguste Renoir:
 By the Seashore
 Dance at Bougival
 Dance in the Country
 The Umbrellas (Les Parapluies)
 Georges Rochegrosse - Vitellius Dragged Through the Streets of Rome by the Popoulus
 Ilya Repin – Religious Procession in Kursk Province
 William Wetmore Story – Chief Justice John Marshall (bronze)
 James Tissot
 The Bridesmaid
 A Little Nimrod
 Henri de Toulouse-Lautrec – Self-portrait in a mirror
 Jan van Beers – Portrait of a Young Woman
Henry Van Brunt and Frank M. Howe – William Washington Gordon Monument
 Vincent van Gogh
 Cottages (continuing series)
 Peasant Character Studies (continuing series)
 Bulb Fields
 Cows in the Meadow (lost)
 Drawbridge in Nieuw-Amsterdam (watercolor)
 Farm with Stacks of Peat
 Farmhouse Among Trees
 Farmhouses in Loosduinen near The Hague at Twilight
 Footbridge across a Ditch
 Landscape with a Church at Twilight
 Landscape with Dunes
 Landscape with Trees (watercolor)
 Landscape with Wheelbarrow (watercolor)
 Marshy Landscape
 Meadows near Rijswijk and the Schenkweg
 Peatery in Drenthe
 Three Figures near a Canal with Windmill
 A Wind-Beaten Tree
 Fritz von Uhde – Summer Resort
 Erik Werenskiold
 September
 Shepherds at Tåtøy
 W. L. Wyllie – Toil, Glitter, Grime and Wealth on a Flowing Tide

Births
 3 February – Camille Bombois, French naïve painter (died 1970).
 18 February – Jacques Ochs, French artist, épée and foil fencer and Olympic gold medallist (died 1971).
 12 April
 Francis Cadell, Scottish Colourist painter (died 1937)
  Imogen Cunningham, American photographer (died 1976).
 24 June – Jean Metzinger, French painter and art theorist (died 1956).
 16 July – Charles Sheeler, American modernist painter and photographer (died 1965).
 31 July – Erich Heckel, German painter and printmaker (died 1970).
 19 August – Coco Chanel, French fashion designer (died 1972).
 20 August – Caroline Risque, American sculptor and painter (died 1952).
 14 September – Richard Gerstl, Austrian painter and draughtsman (died 1908).
 9 November – Charles Demuth, American painter (died 1935).
 4 December – Felice Casorati, Italian painter (died 1963).
 24 December – Stojan Aralica, famous Serbian Impressionist painter and academic (died 1980).
 26 December – Maurice Utrillo, French painter (died 1955).
 date unknown – Charles Jourdan, French fashion designer (died 1976).

Deaths
 January 12 – Clark Mills, American sculptor (born 1810)
 January 19 – Guillaume Geefs, Belgian sculptor (born 1805)
 January 23 – Gustave Doré, French illustrator (born 1832)
 February 26 – Miguel Ângelo Lupi, Portuguese painter (born 1826)
 April 30 – Édouard Manet, French painter (born 1832; died following amputation)
 July 14 – Edward Calvert, English painter and printmaker (born 1799)
 August 19 – József Borsos, Hungarian portrait painter and photographer (born 1821)
 November 24 – Albert Fitch Bellows, American landscape painter (born 1829)
 December 11 – Richard Doyle, British illustrator (born 1824)
 Eva Gonzales

References

 
Years of the 19th century in art
1880s in art